Wilmot is a masculine given name. It may refer to:

Wilmot Brookings (1830–1905), American pioneer, frontier judge, early South Dakotan politician and provisional governor of the Dakota Territory
Wilmot Arthur de Silva (1869-1942), Sri Lankan Sinhala veterinary surgeon, politician, and philanthropist
Wilmot Fawkes (1846–1926), Royal Navy admiral
Wilmot Fleming (1916-1978), American politician
Wilmot Hudson Fysh (1895–1974), Australian aviator and businessman, a co-founder of Australian airline Qantas
Wilmot James (born 5 1953), South African academic-turned-politician
Wilmot A. Perera (1905–1973), Sri Lankan politician and philanthropist
Wilmot Perkins (1931–2012), Jamaican radio personality and talk show host
Wilmot Redd (early 17th century-1692), one of the victims of the Salem witch trials
Wilmot Moses Smith (1852–1906), American lawyer, jurist and songwriter
Wilmot Vaughan, 3rd Viscount Lisburne (died 1766), Welsh landowner and Irish peer
Wilmot Vaughan, 1st Earl of Lisburne (1728–1800), Welsh peer and politician, son of the above
Wilmot Vaughan, 2nd Earl of Lisburne (1755–1820), Welsh landowner and Irish peer, son of the above
Wilmot Vyvyan (1861–1937), Anglican Bishop of Zululand

English-language masculine given names